Hilarempis soror is a species of dance flies, in the fly family of Empididae. They are known to be diurnal.

References

Hilarempis
Insects described in 1969
Diptera of Africa